The North Fork Owyhee Wilderness is on the high basalt plateaus of Owyhee County in southwestern Idaho in the western United States.  The rivers within it offer whitewater rapids up to Class IV. The upper  of the North Fork Owyhee River, from the Idaho–Oregon border to the upstream boundary of the wilderness, are part of the National Wild and Scenic Rivers System. Of this total,  are classified as wild and the remaining  are classified "recreational".

Geography
These canyons in Owyhee County have been called "the largest concentration of sheer-walled volcanic rhyolite and basalt canyons in the western United States".

Legislative history
The North Fork Owyhee Wilderness was created by the Omnibus Public Land Management Act of 2009 and signed into law by President Barack Obama on March 30, 2009. Also created in the Omnibus Land Act were five additional southwestern Idaho wilderness areas in Owyhee County, collectively known as the Owyhee Canyonlands Wilderness Areas:

 Big Jacks Creek Wilderness - 
 Bruneau – Jarbidge Rivers Wilderness - 
 Little Jacks Creek Wilderness - 
 Owyhee River Wilderness  - 
 Pole Creek Wilderness - 

The Act of 2009 added  of wilderness within the state of Idaho.

Wilderness areas do not allow motorized or mechanical equipment including bicycles. Although camping and fishing are allowed with proper permit, no roads or buildings are constructed and there is also no logging or mining, in compliance with the 1964 Wilderness Act. Wilderness areas within National Forests and Bureau of Land Management areas also allow hunting in season.

Natural history
The North Fork Owyhee Wilderness lies within the Owyhee Desert, part of the northern Basin and Range ecoregion, although hydrologically the wilderness area is within the Snake River – Columbia River drainage. The area is home to mule deer, pronghorn, bighorn sheep, sage grouse, hawks, eagles, falcons, plus many songbirds, as well as numerous rare plants.

See also
 List of largest wilderness areas in the United States
 List of U.S. Wilderness Areas
 Wilderness Act

References

External links

 Owyhee Uplands Backcountry Byway - Bureau of Land Management

Wilderness areas of Idaho
Owyhee River
Protected areas of Owyhee County, Idaho
Bureau of Land Management areas in Idaho
Protected areas established in 2009